This is a list of films produced by the Tollywood (Telugu language film industry) based in Hyderabad in the year 1983. Total movies released 150

(A) stands for Adult in that year, present day Parental Guidance(PG) - may contain vulgar,  slang, language, violence,  etc. etc., NR Likely Not Released, missed CBFC rating

(R) Regular Show, (M) Morning Show, (N) Noon Show

Released films

Dubbed films

References

1983
Telugu
Telugu films